Gaser may refer to:

 Gåser, a village in the former municipality of Hals Municipality, Denmark
 a gravity laser

See also
 Gasser (disambiguation)
 Geyser
 Graser (disambiguation)